Nil de Oliveira (born 1986) is a Brazilian-Swedish athlete and short distance runner. On 29 June,  Oliveira qualified for the 200 metres final at the 2012 European Athletics Championships in Helsinki competing for Sweden.

References

1986 births
Swedish male sprinters
Living people
Date of birth missing (living people)